Copaxa lavendera is a species of moth in the family Saturniidae first described by John O. Westwood in 1854. It is found from Mexico to Honduras. It has been spotted in the Netherlands on multiple occasions, where it was imported on plants.

The wingspan is about 110 mm.

References

Moths described in 1854
Saturniinae